The Grosvenor Mountains are a group of widely scattered mountains and nunataks rising above the Antarctic polar plateau east of the head of Mill Glacier, extending from Mount Pratt in the north to the Mount Raymond area in the south, and from Otway Massif in the northwest to Larkman Nunatak in the southeast. They were discovered by Rear Admiral Richard E. Byrd on the Byrd Antarctic Expedition flight to the South Pole in November 1929, and named by him for Gilbert Hovey Grosvenor, President of the National Geographic Society, which helped finance the expedition. Several peaks near Mount Raymond were apparently observed by Ernest Shackleton in 1908, although they were then considered to be a continuation of the Dominion Range.

Features
Geographical features include:

 Aitken Nunatak
 Block Peak
 Hayman Nunataks
 Hayman
 Johnston Heights
 Larkman Nunatak
 Mauger Nunatak
 Mount Block
 Mount Bumstead
 Mount Cecily
 Mount Pratt
 Mount Raymond
 Otway Massif

References

Mountain ranges of the Ross Dependency
Dufek Coast